In Karajarri mythology, the Bagadjimbiri are two brothers and creator gods.  They arose from the ground as dingos and made water-holes, sex organs (from a mushroom and another fungus) for the androgynous first people, and invented circumcision.  Taking human form, the Bagadjimbiri began an argument with Ngariman, a quoll-person.  Ngariman was annoyed by the Bagadjimbiri's laughter.  He killed the brothers underground, but was drowned by Dilga, their mother, who flooded the underground murder-spot with her milk, which also revived her sons.  The Bagadjimbiri eventually turned into snakes and went to live in the sky as clouds.

References

Australian Aboriginal gods
Creator gods